Rizky Febian Adriansyah Sutisna, professionally known as Rizky Febian (born 25 February 1998), is an Indonesian singer, songwriter, actor and TV presenter. He is the eldest son of the Indonesian comedian Sule. He is famous for his single "Kesempurnaan Cinta".

Biography
Rizky Febian Andriansyah Sutisna is the eldest son of the famous Indonesian comedian Sule (Sutisna) and his ex-wife Lina. His name began to rise when he starred in Indonesian soap operas. Before starting his musical career, he occasionally appeared together with his father. Later he also frequently appeared on several TV programmes. Rizky always supported by his father regarding his singing and comedian career.

In 2011 along with Sule, he released his first single, titled Papa Phone. Then followed by Smile U Do not Cry together with 3 Djanggo (feat. comedian Andre Taulany), released in 2013.

Filmography

Film

Television series

Variety shows

Discography

Singles

Soundtrack appearances

Awards and nominations

References

External links
 
 

Indonesian male comedians
Indonesian comedians
Indonesian jazz singers
21st-century Indonesian male singers
Indonesian pop singers
Indonesian rhythm and blues singers
Anugerah Musik Indonesia winners
Indonesian television presenters
Male actors from West Java
People from Bandung
Sundanese people
1998 births
Living people
Male jazz musicians